Robert John Rouse (born June 18, 1964) is a Canadian former professional ice hockey player. He is a two-time Stanley Cup champion, winning in back to back years with the Detroit Red Wings in 1997 and 1998.

Playing career
A prototypical stay-at-home defenceman, Rouse was drafted in 1982 by the Minnesota North Stars. After playing parts of six seasons with the North Stars, Rouse was traded to the Washington Capitals at the trade deadline of the 1988–89 NHL season in the deal that also sent Dino Ciccarelli to the Capitals. His steady and tough style of defensive play helped guide the Capitals to their first semifinals appearance, in 1990.

During the middle of the 1990–91 season he was traded to the Toronto Maple Leafs, along with Peter Zezel, in exchange for Al Iafrate. Rouse joined the Detroit Red Wings in 1994 as a free agent, and helped them in two of their Stanley Cup wins (1997 and 1998), one of which involved topping one of his former clubs, the Capitals. Rouse moved on to play with the San Jose Sharks in 1998–99 and retired during the 1999–2000 season after the Sharks released him.

In 1,061 NHL games, Rouse had 37 goals, 181 assists, and 1,559 penalty minutes. He served as a full-time alternate captain with the Maple Leafs, and as part-time alternate captain with the Capitals and Red Wings.

Career statistics

Regular season and playoffs

International

Awards
 WHL Second All-Star Team – 1983
 WHL East First All-Star Team – 1984

See also
List of NHL players with 1,000 games played

References

External links

1964 births
Billings Bighorns players
Canadian ice hockey defencemen
Detroit Red Wings players
Sportspeople from Surrey, British Columbia
Lethbridge Broncos players
Living people
Minnesota North Stars draft picks
Minnesota North Stars players
Nanaimo Islanders players
San Jose Sharks players
Springfield Indians players
Stanley Cup champions
Toronto Maple Leafs players
Washington Capitals players
Ice hockey people from British Columbia